Lota is an eastern outer coastal suburb in the City of Brisbane, Queensland, Australia.

Geography 
The south and east of the suburb is dominated by the mudflats and mangrove wetlands of Lota Creek and Waterloo Bay. To the west and north, the land rises towards the heights of Manly and Manly West.

The suburb is of primarily post-war residential make-up but is gradually being developed with modern beachside properties.

History

This part of Moreton Bay was originally occupied by the semi-nomadic Mipirimm subclan of the Quandamooka people. Lota and neighbouring suburb Manly were and continue to be known as Narlung to the Quandamooka people, likely meaning 'the place of long shadows'. The name ningi ningi (meaning 'oysters') may also have been used in relation to the area of Lota near the creek. Major Quandamooka campsites in the area in the mid-1800s were in Manly and Wynnum.

Lota was acquired by Irish-born politician and pastoralist William Duckett White in 1860, following sub-division of the lands from Lytton to Fig Tree Point. The first Queensland Premier, Robert Herbert, entered into a partnership with Duckett White for some of the land. The suburb is named after Duckett White's residence, Lota House, built in 1863. Lota House was the heart of a productive estate, with sugar cane and fodder grown on the flats near the creek and orchards planted on higher ground near Macdonald Street. Aboriginal and South Sea Islander people worked the property, camping to the west of Lota House. Duckett White's land was first subdivided in 1911 to the east of the present railway line. The Lota Park Estate, west of the line, was sold in 1918.

The first Cleveland railway line was opened in 1889 through Lota to Cleveland. In 1960, the railway line between Lota and Cleveland was closed, leaving Lota as the terminus until the re-opening of the line in stages between 1983 and 1987.  

In February 1918, a Presbyterian Sunday School was established by Mrs Alice Rix, who purchased a piece of land with a cottage and altered it to be suited to a Sunday School. As churches services were also held in the building, a larger building was needed and the congregation was unsure whether to enlarge the existing building or construct a new church at greater expense. In September 1928, the existing building re-opened following an enlargement. However, the death Mrs Elizabeth Annie Farmer of Macdonald Street, Lota, on 16 June 1930 resulted in a bequest of  £300 to the church. The congregation was also able to borrow £200 from the Presbyterian Extension Fund (an initiative of Presbyterian benefactor William Robert Black to assist fledgling Presbyterian churches). These sources of funding enabled the congregation build a new church. Impressed by the Cannon Hill Presbyterian Church built in 1930, the congregation engaged its architect George Trotter to build them a similar church. On Saturday 8 August 1931, Lord Mayor John William Greene presided over a stump-capping ceremony for the new church. The Rix-Farmer Memorial Presbyterian Church was officially opened on Saturday 24 October 1931 by Miss Annie Leighton Young, a niece of Mrs Alice Rix. The dedication was performed by Reverend Robert Millar. On Saturday 16 September 1933, the church hall (the original extended building on the site) burned down; a new hall was opened on Saturday 2 June 1934 by Miss Annie Leighton Young.

In 1921, Lota Methodist Church opened at 29 Ambool Street. It was sold in 1982 as part of rationalising the portfolio of church properties resulting from the amalgamation of Methodist, Presbyterian and Congregational Churches into the Uniting Church in Australia. The church building is still extant but is used as a house.

Lota School of Arts opened on the corner of Alexander and MacDonald Streets in 1927, and played host to dance evenings, film screenings and classes.
In 1931, Great Depression 'relief work' led to the reclamation of land along the Esplanade, and the building of Lota's seawall.

Lota State School opened on 29 January 1952.

The former St Agnes' Anglican Church on The Esplanade (near Orallo Street, approx ) was dedicated on 16 May 1957 by Archbishop Halse. Its closure was approved on 21 January 1994 by Assistant Bishop Ron Williams. The building was moved to Alexandra Hills Parish.

Bayside Uniting Church was established in 1990 in Wondall Road, Manly West, combining four Uniting Churches located at:

 Ashton Street, Wynnum, a former Methodist Church
 Kingsley Terrace, Manly, a former Methodist Church
 Preston Road, Manly West, a former Methodist Church
 Yamboyna Street, Manly, a former Congregational Church

Due to earlier or later closures, the Bayside Uniting Church also incorporated congregations from:

 "The Springs" Methodist Church in Manly Road, Manly West
 Lota Methodist Church in Ambool Street, Lota
 Lindum Methodist Church at Sibley Road, Wynnum West
 Hemmant Methodist Church in Hemmant-Tingalpa Road, Hemmant

The median age of the Lota population was 41 years of age, three years above the Australian median. 74.3% of people living in Lota were born in Australia, compared to the national average of 66.7%; the next most common countries of birth were England 7.3%, New Zealand 6.0%, South Africa 1.7%, Scotland 1.3%, Ireland 0.7%. 92.9% of people spoke only English at home; the next most common languages were 0.7% German, 0.4% Mandarin, 0.3% French, 0.3% Dutch and 0.3% Japanese.

Heritage listings 

Lota has a number of heritage-listed sites, including:

 34 Herbert Street: Lota Sanitary Depot (former) & BCC Pound Residence (Melaleuca Environmental Park)
 137 Oceana Terrace: Manly-Lota Presbyterian Church (also known as Rix-Farmer Memorial Church)
 162 Oceana Terrace: Lota House (also known as Edwin Marsden Tooth Memorial Home), the residence of William Duckett White, Member of the Queensland Legislative Council

Education 

Lota State School is a government primary (Prep-6) school for boys and girls at 26 Richard Street. In 2018, the school had an enrolment of 200 students with 16 teachers (12 full-time equivalent) and 13 non-teaching staff (7 full-time equivalent). It includes a special education program.

There are no secondary schools in Lota. The nearest government secondary school is Wynnum State High School in Wynnum to the north.

Amenities
Lota is home to several key amenities, including Bayside PCYC, Bayside United Soccer Club, Lota State School and Melaleuca Environmental Park. The Lota Foreshore Park (formerly the Lota Camping Reserve) is a large bay-front park that stretches along the eastern edge of the suburb, with playgrounds, barbecuing facilities, boat ramps and a sculpture park. A boardwalk crosses Lota Creek from Whites Road to Chelsea Road in Ransome.

Manly-Lota Presbyterian Church is at 137 Oceana Terrace. It is part of the Presbyterian Church of Queensland.

Transport
Lota railway station provides access to regular Queensland Rail City network services to Brisbane and Cleveland.

Governance
At the local level, Lota is in the Wynnum-Manly ward of the Brisbane City Council, represented by Cr Peter Cumming since March 1994. At the state level, Lota is within the Lytton electorate, a traditionally safe Labor seat, held by Joan Pease. LNP MP Ross Vasta has held the Federal electorate of Bonner since 2010.

References

External links

 ourbrisbane.com website, Lota section
 

 
Suburbs of the City of Brisbane